Salem International College may refer to:
Salem International University, located in United States
Schule Schloss Salem, located in Germany